English furniture has developed largely in line with styles in the rest of northern Europe, but has been interpreted in a distinctive fashion. There were significant regional differences in style, for example between the North Country and the West Country. Salisbury and Norwich were prominent early centres of furniture production.

Periods in English furniture design
 Middle Ages
 Elizabethan
 Jacobean era
 Restoration / Carolean
 William and Mary style
 Queen Anne - see Queen Anne style furniture
 Georgian
 Victorian - see Victorian decorative arts
 Art Deco
 Modernist

See also
Elizabethan and Jacobean furniture
Sheraton style

References

Further reading